Sophie Chang (born 1944) is a Taiwanese philanthropist, author and painter. She is chairperson of the TSMC Charity Foundation, chairperson of the Weiyi Social Welfare Charity Foundation, director of the Dunan Foundation and director of the Modern Women's Foundation. Chang met with the Dalai Lama in 2007, and has shaped her work according to his teachings.

Philanthropy 
Chang is the chair of the TSMC Charity Foundation. She has been the president of the TSMC Volunteer Society in 2004.

Chang has personally responded to natural disasters and emergencies through her role with TSMC, leading the foundation and TSMC employee volunteers in the support of underserved women, children, and seniors as well as education and environmental protection. Her work also focuses on energy conservation and technical and vocational education. In 2021, Chang established three solar power stations for the Ruifu Education Center in Tainan in collaboration with Tainan Mayor Huang Wei-che, Taiju Group Chairman Wu Yigui, and National Cheng Kung University President Su Huizhen, and installed powr-saving LED lights in 32 schools in Pianxiang township as part of a “green energy for public welfare” model to provide social welfare organizations with reduced costs and sustainable growth.

Chang created the public welfare platform "Sending Love" to promote social responsibility and encourage other companies to get involved in philanthropy, as well as the "Network of Compassion" platform which connects more than 7,000 volunteers, hospitals and health services to provide medical care for low-income, isolated seniors. The network also garnered government involvement in promoting rural education in elementary and junior high schools.

Chang works to promote filial piety and cooperates with the local government and the Ministry of Education to integrate the spirit of filial piety into students' lives. She successfully included the subject and materials into the Ministry of Education's syllabus, created the national filial piety education workshop with the Ministry of Education's National Education Department as well as the National Filial Piety Resource Center alongside the National Education Administration. In 2019, she held the first National High School Filial Piety Education Microfilm Competition.

Chang's work also focuses on bolstering technological and vocational education in rural communities, and encourages student participation and self-confidence with leadership activities and skill-building such as cycling, mountain climbing and drumming as part of a collaboration with the After School Association of Taiwan. Chang has collaborated with the Boyou Foundation, which aims to narrow the educational gap between students in urban and rural areas, and her work is supported by Lai Qingde, former mayor of Tainan. In 2021, Chang launched a Technical Vocational Training initiative in partnership with LOHAS and the Yunlin County Government which equipped students of a remote township with the tools to grow and sell champignon mushrooms.

In 2012, Chang led TSMC's establishment of a new tea plant in the mountains of central Taiwan as part of an effort to help Alishan’s indigenous people rebuild the region following Typhoon Morakot in 2009. In 2014, Chang led an on-site relief team in Kaohsiung following the gas explosions. In 2018, Chang visited the site of the 6.0 earthquake in Hualien County to comfort the victims and arranged to bring 700 members of TSMC staff to the area to promote tourism, and later planned eight more trips to revitalize the area. In 2021, she created and ran a campaign through TSMC to provide COVID-19 relief to India's hospitals, and to set up contactless testing stations throughout Taiwan. Later that year, TSMC also jointly donated 15 million doses of the BNT vaccines to Taiwan with Foxconn, the Yongling Foundation and the Tzu Chi Foundation, with Sophie Chang representing the company upon the arrival of the first 930,000 doses in Taiwan. Also in 2021, she initiated a donation of 1,200 uniforms to firefighters who responded to the Taroko Express train derailment as part of an allocation by the TSMC foundation to help improve firefighters' equipment across the country.

Chang also serves as a public speaker, and gave the keynote speech at the 2020 International Women's Day Forum. In April 2021, she held a press conference at the Far Eastern International Hotel in Taipei to discuss TSMC's charitable accomplishments and to encourage other enterprises to pursue philanthropy and volunteerism. In 2022, Chang was invited to join Caixun’s ESG forum to discuss public welfare.

Art and writings 
Chang is an author and painter. She began painting with traditional ink, but transitioned to oil paints in 2019. Her written works include "Guide the Way", "My Growth" and "Progress on the Easel". In 2017, her painting "Spring Morning Dawn" was sold by Ravenel International Art Group for more than NT$4.5 million, and in 2018 her painting "Samantabhadra" was sold for NT$4.5 million. In 2019, Chang was invited to attend the Asia-Pacific Economic Cooperation (APEC) Leadership Summit with her husband, Morris Chang, and the pair gifted the heads of state with several of Sophie's paintings. Also in 2019, her painting "Earth Mountain Lan" was donated to a charity sale at Christie's Hong Kong spring auction and sold for NT$4.93 million. In 2020, her oil painting "The Source of Hope" was sold for over NT$8.7 million, with proceeds donated to the Department of Disease Control of the Ministry of Health and Welfare of Taiwan. Also in 2020, Chang held her first solo exhibition "Love. Endless" at the Tainan Art Museum featuring 15 paintings. In 2021, Chang partnered with designer Wang Chen Tsai-Hsia to turn two of her paintings into clothing items as part of Shiatzy Chen’s spring 2022 fashion line. The items were included in the one-month "Zhu Yun" exhibition in Zhongshan, with proceeds donated to the TSMC Charity Foundation. Chang also collaborated with Wang, the Tzu Chi Foundation and Chen Wenqian to create and deliver personal silk scarves to Syrian refugees and war victims in 2022.

Recognition 
Chang was named one of the 50 most influential Asian philanthropists by Tatler Hong Kong in 2018, and won the 14th Compassion Award with five others in 2019.

In 2021, Chang was awarded the Cultural Association Medal by the Taiwanese Ministry of Culture.

Personal life 
Sophie is married to TSMC founder Morris Chang.

References 

Taiwanese philanthropists
Taiwanese painters
Taiwanese writers
1944 births
Living people